(1554 – September 26, 1626), sometimes referred to as Wakizaka Yasuharu, was a daimyō (feudal lord) of Awaji Island who fought under a number of warlords over the course of Japan's Sengoku period. 
Wakisaka originally served under Akechi Mitsuhide, a vassal of Oda Nobunaga.

Biography
In 1581, he took part on Tenshō Iga War, he was one of several who led Nobunaga's troops in the Siege of Hijiyama. The following year, Akechi betrayed Oda Nobunaga and took his power and lands, but was defeated two weeks later at the Battle of Yamazaki.  Wakisaka then joined the victor, Hashiba Hideyoshi, who had become a conspicuous figure as a retainer of Oda Nobunaga. 

Following the Battle of Shizugatake in 1583, Wakisaka came to be known as one of the shichi-hon-yari (七本槍), or Seven Spears of Shizugatake. These Seven would be among Hideyoshi's most trusted generals, especially in naval combat. Wakisaka was granted the fief of Awaji Island, worth 30,000 koku, in 1585. 

He was then made commander of part of Hideyoshi's fleet, taking part in Hideyoshi's 1587 campaigns in Kyūshū, the 1590 Siege of Odawara, and the invasions of Korea, which took place from 1592 to 1598.

Korean campaign
In 1592, Wakisaka led 1,500 soldiers and landed on the Korean peninsula. He was defeated by Admiral Yi Sun-shin at the battle of Hansando and lost most of his fleet. Barely surviving the battle, he hid on a nearby uninhabited island and lived by eating seaweed until the enemy withdrew. He participated in both ground and naval actions in various places on the Korean peninsula. He was also ordered to dispatch a 1,200-man fleet during the Keichō Invasion and annihilated a Korean fleet attacking his position which was led by Won Gyun during a counterattack in July 1597. Despite his actions, he was unable to counter Admiral Yi Sun-shin, whose naval activities effectively cut off Japanese naval supply lines to the Korean Peninsula; despite this failure and the ultimate defeat of the Japanese forces during the campaigns, Wakisaka's reward for participating in this war was an increase in territory to 3,000 Koku.

Battle of Sekigahara
In 1600, Wakisaka was going to side with Tokugawa Ieyasu, but was compelled to oppose him, siding with Ishida Mitsunari, who had raised Wakisaka's army when he stayed in Osaka. On October 21, during the decisive Battle of Sekigahara, Wakisaka switched sides along with Kobayakawa Hideaki, he defeated Ōtani Yoshitsugu's force, and contributed to the Tokugawa victory.  

After the battle, Tokugawa allowed Wakisaka to continue governing his domain of Awaji. In succeeding years, he was given another fief, at Ozu, Iyo Province, worth 53,000 koku.  His son, Wakisaka Yasumoto, succeeded to the house after his death.

Popular culture
 Portrayed by Kim Myung-soo in the 2004-2005 KBS1 TV series Immortal Admiral Yi Sun-sin.
 Portrayed by Cho Jin-woong in the 2014 film The Admiral: Roaring Currents.
 Portrayed by Byun Yo-han in the 2022 film Hansan: Rising Dragon.

References

Further reading
Turnbull, Stephen (1998). The Samurai Sourcebook. London: Cassell & Co.

1554 births
1626 deaths
Samurai
Daimyo
Toyotomi retainers
People from Shiga Prefecture